Panargiakos Football Club is a Greek football club based in Argos, Greece. The association was founded in 1926. The club is a founder member of the Argolida Football Clubs Association.

Panargiakos played in First Division in the 1956–57 Panhellenic Championship and in the second level of Greek football several times: 1965–1967, 1970–1975, 1981–1982, and 1990–1998. In 2008, they were promoted to Gamma Ethniki.

History 
It was founded in 1926 as "Pan-Hellenic Association of National Physical Education". The head of this historical movement was the writer Georgios Logothetis, who had settled in Argos since 1923, coming from Spetses. From 1926 to 1933 he participates only in friendly matches. In 1933 Panagiakoakos was deactivated and reactivated in 1945 as "Panarchiakos APO". In 1947 he participates for the first time in a formal organization since he has become a member of the National Technical University of Athens. Argolidokorinthia.

The biggest moment of Panargeiakos's history is his participation as a South Group champion in the 1957 Pan-Hellenic Championship with ten teams: from Athens to Panathinaikos, Apollonas and Panionios, from Piraeus to Olympic, National and Progressive, since Thessaloniki Mars and PAOK and the champion of the North Group, Doxa Dramas. In the 1990s, Panageriakos participated in the 2nd National Championship, but never won the championship of the First National Championship. In recent years the team has participated either in the local championships of Argolida or in the championship of the 4th National, but it remains the most favorite club for the Argian fans.

On May 31, 2008, he won the Cup of Amateurs defeating Nike Polygyros with 3–0 in the lead. The final was in Lamia. In the same season (2007–08) he won the championship in the 7th group of the 4th National Division and the Cup of EPC of Argolida, achieving a treble. He fought for two seasons in the C National, without success, and was again relegated to the National Division. In August 2012, for the first time in the history of the club, a second team is formed, the young Panargeiakos who come from academies of the wider region and compete in the A 2 category championship.

In the 2012–13 season, Panagieraskos won the 4th place in the 7th Group of the National Championship again in the National Championship.

The team's jerseys have previously worn long-career players in the First National Division such as George Donis, Dimitris Kapetanopoulos, Bledar Kola and Andreas Bonavas. Also, many football players in the B and C categories, such as Manolis Ioannis, Filis Spyridon, Batakos Dimitris, Da Silva Eduardo, Kapageridis Savvas, Koulianopoulos Ilias, Karabelas Giorgos, Thodis Dimitris, Pappas Pantelis.

References

External links
Official Site 
Ένωση Ποδοσφαιρικών Σωματείων Αργολίδας

 
Association football clubs established in 1926
Football clubs in Peloponnese (region)
1926 establishments in Greece
Gamma Ethniki clubs